Joseph Janiak is a multi-platinum selling British singer/songwriter and record producer based in Los Angeles, United States. He is mostly known for being a songwriter for the likes of Ellie Goulding, Tove Lo, Snakehips, Britney Spears, Take That, and Adam Lambert. His most known appearance, as both songwriter and producer, was on the multi million selling 2017 hit single "Don't Leave" by Snakehips and MØ.

Discography

Lead singer

Featured appearances

Songwriting and Production Credits

References

British male singer-songwriters
Living people
Year of birth missing (living people)
Place of birth missing (living people)
Singers from London
British record producers